Kuantan Sentral Terminal is a public transportation terminal in Kuantan, Pahang, Malaysia. It is located at Bandar Indera Mahkota. The terminal is the largest public transportation terminal in the East Coast of Peninsula Malaysia.

Rapid Kuantan route 303 plying between this terminal and intracity bus terminal, Hentian Bas Bandar Kuantan at city center, which serves almost all Rapid Kuantan routes. Bus frequency is between 15 - 20 minutes from 6.00 Am to 11.00 PM.

Bus serving at this terminal
 Rapid Kuantan
 Transnasional
 Cepat Ekspress
 Plusliner
 Sani Ekspress
 SP Bumi
 Bas Kesatuan
 Nice
 Etika Ekspress
 Utama Ekspress

See also
 Transport in Malaysia

References

Buildings and structures in Pahang
Transport in Pahang
Bus stations in Malaysia
2013 establishments in Malaysia